Boris Kobe (9 October 1905 – 3 May 1981) was a Slovene architect, painter, and designer.

Kobe was born in Ljubljana in 1905. He studied art at the Department of Architecture at what was then the University of Ljubljana Technical Faculty under Jože Plečnik and graduated in 1929. During the Second World War he was imprisoned in the Allach concentration camp. After the war he worked as an architect, painter, and designer in Ljubljana. He died in 1981. In the early 1940s, he arranged the area around Tivoli Pond and the children's playground next to it.

Awards
He received the Prešeren Award for his architecture, paintings, and designs in 1977. He won the Levstik Award for his illustrations of Ivan Tavčar's Visoška kronika (The Visoko Chronicles) in 1952.

References

Slovenian male painters
Slovenian illustrators
1905 births
1981 deaths
Architects from Ljubljana
Levstik Award laureates
Prešeren Award laureates
University of Ljubljana alumni
20th-century Slovenian painters
20th-century Slovenian male artists
20th-century Slovenian architects